Jeff Gourson (born January 30, 1946) is an American film editor and producer. He has been jointly nominated three times for an Emmy Award for his production work on the television series Quantum Leap.

Film editing work
His film editing work includes:
Tron
Mr. Deeds
Somewhere in Time
Big Top Pee-wee
Little Nicky
Flight of the Navigator
The Incredible Shrinking Woman
The Longest Yard
50 First Dates
White Chicks
Can't Buy Me Love
I Now Pronounce You Chuck and Larry
Click
Beverly Hills Ninja

External links

American film editors
Film producers from California
Television producers from California
1946 births
People from Los Angeles
Living people